The Roman Catholic Diocese of Granada (erected 2 December 1913) in Nicaragua is a suffragan of the Archdiocese of Managua.

Bishops

Ordinaries
José Candida Piñol y Batres (1913–1915)
Canuto José Reyes y Balladares (1915–1951)
Marco Antonio García y Suárez (1953–1972)
Leovigildo López Fitoria, C.M. (1972–2003)
Bernardo Hombach Lütkermeier (2003–2010)
Jorge Solórzano Pérez (since 2010)

Auxiliary bishop
Carlos de la Trinidad Borge y Castrillo (1945-1953), appointed Auxiliary Bishop of Managua

Other priests of this diocese who became bishops
René Sócrates Sándigo Jirón, appointed Bishop of Juigalpa in 2004
Marcial Humberto Guzmán Saballo, appointed Bishop of Juigalpa in 2020

Territorial losses

External links and references

Granada
Granada
Granada
1913 establishments in Nicaragua
Granada, Nicaragua